Utah State Route 221 may refer to:
Utah State Route 221 (1941-1964)
Utah State Route 221 (1964-1969)